Pragati Vidya Mandir is a secondary board high school in Jagda, India, in the city of Rourkela. It is affiliated to Board of Secondary Education, Odisha.

References

Primary schools in India
High schools and secondary schools in Odisha

Educational institutions established in 1979
1979 establishments in Orissa